The Royal Cambodian Navy is the naval warfare service branch of the Royal Cambodian Armed Forces and one of the three uniformed services of the Kingdom of Cambodia. It has an estimated of 4,000 active personnel and operates 228 boats/ships in active service. It is commanded by Admiral Tea Vinh and sails under the jurisdiction of the Ministry of National Defense.

History

Equipment

The navy possesses fifteen patrol craft and a further five patrol craft of the "fast attack" variety.  There are also about 200 motorised and manual canoes.

The country's seagoing capability was boosted in August 2005 when China handed over 5 patrol boats. In 2007 a further 10 were handed over worth $100,000,000. The craft were donated to Cambodia by China to help counter piracy, transnational crime, smuggling and to safeguard future oil installations.

In 2007, Cambodia reported that it was increasing the strength of its navy from 1,000 to 3,000 sailors, apart from creating a force of 2,000 Marine infantry.

Many officers of the Royal Cambodian Navy  received their training at the Vietnam Naval Academy.

Royal Cambodian Navy also have many plans to strengthen their naval fleet with assistance from China, Germany, Vietnam, Indonesia, South Korea, and Japan.

Fleet

Vessels

Bases
Naval bases of the Royal Cambodian Navy include the following:
 Ream Naval Base
 Sihanoukville (civilian port)
 Phnom Penh (river base formerly of the Khmer Rouge)

Navy ranks and insignia

National Committee for Maritime Security (NCMS)
The NCMS was established in December 2010 on the initiative of Prime Minister Hun Sen and with support from international security partners. Part of its role is focusing on fighting against terrorism, piracy, human trafficking, cross-border crimes, drug trafficking as well as on preserving natural resources and conducting emergency rescue works.
It is overseen by Admiral Tea Vinh and has bases in Sihanoukville, Ream and Phnom Penh, working with and for the Royal Cambodian Navy.

NCMS is also responsible for the security of visiting navy's ships and personnel from neighbouring countries and allies, including China, Russia, Japan  and the USA.

See also
 Ministry of Defense, Cambodia
 Royal Cambodian Armed Forces
 Royal Cambodian Army
 Royal Cambodian Air Force

References

Military of Cambodia
Navies by country
Military units and formations established in 1953